Valantia is a genus of flowering plants in the family Rubiaceae. The genus is found from Macaronesia to western  Asia and northeastern tropical Africa.

Species

Valantia aprica 
Valantia calva 
Valantia columella 
Valantia deltoidea 
Valantia hispida 
Valantia lainzii 
Valantia muralis

References

Rubiaceae genera
Rubieae